The  National Film Award for Best Screenplay is one of the categories in the National Film Awards presented annually by the Directorate of Film Festivals, the organisation set up by Ministry of Information and Broadcasting in India. It is one of several awards presented for feature films and awarded with Rajat Kamal (Silver Lotus). The award is announced for films produced in a year across the country, in all Indian languages. , the award comprises a Rajat Kamal, a certificate, and a cash prize of  50,000.

The National Film Awards were established in 1954 to "encourage production of the films of a high aesthetic and technical standard and educational and culture value" and also planned to include awards for regional films. The awards were instituted as the "State Awards for Films" but were renamed to "National Film Awards" at the 15th National Film Awards in 1967 and a new category of award for Best Screenplay was introduced, presented with a plaque and a cash prize. At the 57th National Film Awards in 2009, the Screenplay award was reclassified into three different awards: Screenplay Writer (Original), Screenplay Writer (Adapted), and Dialogues. Although the Indian film industry produces films in around twenty languages and dialects, as of 2016, the seventy-three unique writers who have been awarded, have worked in nine major languages: Hindi (twenty awards), Malayalam (twelve awards), Bengali (eleven awards), Tamil (eight awards), Marathi (seven awards), Kannada (five awards), Telugu (three awards), English (two awards), Sanskrit and Assamese (one award each).

The inaugural award, in 1967, of this category was presented to S. L. Puram Sadanandan for the Malayalam film Agniputhri. No award was presented at the 23rd National Film Awards (1975). , Malayalam author and screenplay writer M. T. Vasudevan Nair holds the record of winning maximum awards in category with four wins for the films: Oru Vadakkan Veeragadha (1989), Kadavu (1991), Sadayam (1992), and Parinayam (1994). Bengali filmmaker Satyajit Ray was presented the award in 1993 posthumously for the film Uttoran; he had earlier received awards for Pratidwandi (1970) and Sonar Kella (1974). At the 59th National Film Awards in 2011, Girish Kulkarni was awarded both the Best Actor and Best Dialogue Awards for the Marathi film Deool. The film was itself was adjudged the Best Feature Film. In 2015 at the 63rd ceremony, the awards for both Original Screenplay and Dialogue were jointly presented to Juhi Chaturvedi and Himanshu Sharma for their films Piku and Tanu Weds Manu: Returns, respectively.

, sixty-eight awards have been presented for Original Screenplay writing, eighteen for Adapted Screenplay writing, and thirteen for dialogue. The most recent recipients of the awards are Sudha Kongara and Shalini Ushadevi (Screenplay Writer (Original) for Tamil film Soorarai Pottru) and Mandonne Ashwin (Dialogue for another Tamil film Mandela), who were honoured at the 68th National Film Awards.

Award 
The first recipient of the award, S. L. Puram Sadanandan, was presented with a plaque and  5000 cash prize. The award was revised in 1973 at the 21st ceremony to include  10,000 cash, a silver medal and a certificate. It was shared by Mrinal Sen and Ashish Burman for their Bengali film Padatik. At the 54th awarding ceremony in 2006, the next revision of the award was declared to include cash remuneration of  50,000 which was presented to Abhijat Joshi, Rajkumar Hirani and Vidhu Vinod Chopra for their Hindi film Lage Raho Munna Bhai in which Mahatma Gandhi's philosophy of non-violence was depicted.

For fourteen times, multiple writers were awarded for their work in a single film; Mrinal Sen and Ashish Burman for Padatik (1973), Satyadev Dubey, Shyam Benegal, and Girish Karnad for Bhumika (1977), T. S. Ranga and T. S. Nagabharana for Grahana (1978), Ashok Mishra and Saeed Akhtar Mirza for Naseem (1995), Manoj Tyagi and Nina Arora for Page 3 (2004), Prakash Jha, Shridhar Raghavan, and Manoj Tyagi for Apaharan (2005), Abhijat Joshi, Rajkumar Hirani, and Vidhu Vinod Chopra for Lage Raho Munna Bhai (2006), Gopal Krishan Pai and Girish Kasaravalli for Kanasemba Kudureyaneri (2009), P. F. Mathews and Harikrishna for Kutty Srank (2009), Anant Mahadevan and Sanjay Pawar for Mee Sindhutai Sapkal (2010), Vikas Bahl, Nitesh Tiwari, and Vijay Maurya for Chillar Party (2011), Bhavesh Mandalia and Umesh Shukla for OMG – Oh My God! (2012), Sriram Raghavan, Arijit Biswas, Yogesh Chandekar, Hemanth Rao, Pooja Ladha Surti for Andhadhun (2018), Sudha Kongara and Shalini Ushadevi for Soorarai Pottru (2020).

Shyamoli Banerjee Deb, one of the jury members at the 53rd National Film Awards, filed a petition objecting to the selections in five awards categories; the Best Feature Film in Hindi, the Best First Film of a Director, the Best Actress, the Best Screenplay, and the Best Special Effects. Deb challenged the decision to confer the award to Prakash Jha, Shridhar Raghavan, and Manoj Tyagi for the Hindi film Apaharan and claimed that the film was not in the primary selection list. The Delhi High Court put a stay on the announcement and requested a reply from the Directorate of Film Festivals. Fourteen months later, Justice B. D. Ahmed removed the stay and the award was announced for Apaharan.

Winners 
Following are the award winners over the years:

References

External links 
 Official Page for Directorate of Film Festivals, India
 National Film Awards Archives

Screenplay
Screenwriting awards for film